Personal Trainer: Walking   is a 2008 exergaming application developed by Nintendo Network Service Development (Nintendo NSD) and Creatures Inc. for the Nintendo DS. The pedometer accessory was developed in-house at Nintendo NSD, while the software portion was developed in conjunction with Nintendo NSD, Creatures Inc., and Engines.

It is part of both Nintendo's Touch! Generations brand and the Personal Trainer series. It is one of only five Nintendo DS titles to support Mii characters, three of which are Japan exclusives.

Overview 
Personal Trainer: Walking allows up to four users to track their walking, jogging or running activities through a series of graphs, charts and statistics, as well as set goals for themselves. The game is packaged with two infrared pedometers that communicate to the game the user's walking data. Additional pedometers are sold separately.

The game uses Miis to track each user's progress, and allows users to either create a Mii in-game (A first for the Nintendo DS), or wirelessly transfer an existing Mii from a Wii console's Mii Channel to their Nintendo DS. The game also features a number of minigames to unlock, and users can also upload their data online via the Nintendo Wi-Fi Connection to add to weekly leaderboards and a world step count that plots a virtual trek across the solar system.

Reception 
Official Nintendo Magazine scored the game 75%, noting the health benefits of exercising and addictiveness of following statistics, but also noted the inherent pointlessness of the game.

The game sold 26,000 copies in its first week of release in Japan.

See also 
 List of Nintendo DS games
 Personal Trainer: Cooking
 Personal Trainer: Math
 Brain Age: Train Your Brain in Minutes a Day!
 Brain Age 2: More Training in Minutes a Day!

Notes

 Known in Japan as 

 Known in Europe as Walk with me! Do you know your walking routine?

References

External links 
 Japanese site
 Personal Trainer: Walking Site (US)

Fitness games
2008 video games
Nintendo DS games
Nintendo DS-only games
Touch! Generations
Video games developed in Japan
Games with Wii-DS connectivity
Single-player video games